Hasanabad (Ḩasanābād) is a village in the Jahangiri Rural District in the Central District of Masjed Soleyman County, Khuzestan Province, Iran. As of the 2006 census, its population was 57, with 15 families.

References 

Populated places in Masjed Soleyman County